The Akaitcho Territory Government is a First Nations organization representing the Dene people of the Northwest Territories, Canada.

Members
The Akaitcho Territory Government consists of the following:
Deninu Kųę́ First Nation - Fort Resolution
Łutsël K'é Dene First Nation - Lutselk'e
Salt River First Nation - Fort Smith
Smith's Landing First Nation - Fort Smith
Yellowknives Dene First Nation - Dettah and Ndilǫ, both adjacent to Yellowknife

References

Politics of the Northwest Territories
First Nations in the Northwest Territories
South Slave Region
North Slave Region
Government of the Northwest Territories
First Nations tribal councils